The Very Best Of Death Row is the second greatest hits album released by American record label Death Row Records on February 22, 2005. It contains some of the best recorded material from the label's former roster, such as 2Pac, Dr. Dre, Snoop Doggy Dogg, Tha Dogg Pound, Warren G, The Lady of Rage, Nate Dogg, Michel'le, and a previously unreleased track from Petey Pablo and Kurupt. It was re-released on November 22, 2005 via Koch Records with accompanying music videos.

The album peaked at number 94 on the Billboard 200 in the United States.

Track listing

Personnel
Tupac Amaru Shakur – performer (tracks: 1, 2, 5), co-producer (track 1)
Andre "Dr. Dre" Young – performer (tracks: 2, 4, 11), producer (tracks: 2-4, 6, 9, 11, 13)
Roger Troutman – performer (track 2)
Calvin "Snoop Dogg" Broadus – performer (tracks: 3, 4, 6, 7, 9-13)
Ricardo "Kurupt" Brown – performer (tracks: 7, 9, 10, 12, 14)
Delmar "Dat Nigga Daz" Arnaud – performer (tracks: 7, 10, 12), producer (tracks: 5, 7, 12, 13)
Michel'le Toussant – performer (track 7)
Warren Griffin III – performer (tracks: 8, 9), producer (track 8)
Nathaniel "Nate Dogg" Hale – performer (tracks: 8, 9)
Robyn "The Lady of Rage" Allen – performer (track 13)
Moses "Petey Pablo" Barrett III – performer & producer (track 14)
Tyrone "Hurt-M-Badd" Wrice – producer (track 1)
Mark "DJ Pooh" Jordan – producer (track 10)
Tha Row Hitters – producers (track 14)
Marion Hugh "Suge" Knight Jr – executive producer

Chart positions

References

External links

2005 greatest hits albums
G-funk compilation albums
Albums produced by DJ Pooh
Albums produced by Dr. Dre
Hip hop compilation albums
Albums produced by Warren G
Albums produced by Hurt-M-Badd
Gangsta rap compilation albums
Record label compilation albums
Albums produced by Daz Dillinger
Death Row Records compilation albums